John Rwangombwa is a Rwandan accountant, politician and banker. He is the governor of the National Bank of Rwanda, the central bank and national banking regulator. He was appointed to that position on 25 February 2013.

Background and education
Rangombwa studied at Makerere University, in Kampala, Uganda, graduating with a Bachelor of Commerce, majoring in accounting. He also holds a Master of Business Administration, specializing in accounting, from the Maastricht School of Management in the Netherlands.

Career
Rangombwa started at Rwanda Revenue Authority where he ascended to the rank of Deputy Commissioner of Customs for Operations, serving in that capacity from June 1998 until February 2002. He joined the Ministry of Finance and Economic Planning in 2002 as the Director of the National Treasury Department. In 2005, he served as the first Accountant General in the ministry. Later that year, he was appointed Permanent Secretary and Secretary to the Treasury. In 2009 he became the Minister of Finance and Economic Planning.

On 25 February 2013, Rangombwa was appointed as Governor of the National Bank of Rwanda, the country's central bank. In this capacity, he oversees the modernization of the bank's monetary policy framework, by targeting inflation and abandoning the targeting of monetary aggregate, in anticipation of the creation of the East African Currency Union. In 2019, Rwanda's cabinet approved an extension of six years to Rwangombwa's term of as governor.

Other responsibilities
 Presidential Advisory Council, Member
 World Economic Forum, Member of the Global Agenda Council 
 International Monetary Fund (IMF), Ex-Officio Alternate Member of the Board of Governors (since 2013)
 East African Development Bank, Member of the Board of Governors (2008-2013)

See also
 List of banks in Rwanda
 Economy of Rwanda
 Rwandan franc
 Monique Nsanzabaganwa

References

External links
Website of National Bank of Rwanda
Rwanda Can Be Proud of Its Economic Progress

Governors of the National Bank of Rwanda
Living people
Year of birth missing (living people)
Rwandan accountants
Rwandan civil servants
Maastricht University alumni
Government ministers of Rwanda
21st-century Rwandan politicians